William Williams ( – February 13, 1906) was a Cornish miner and the last person executed by the state of Minnesota in the United States. In 1905, Williams murdered John Keller and Keller's mother in Saint Paul, and his subsequent botched execution led to increased support for the abolition of capital punishment in Minnesota in 1911.

Background
William Williams was born in 1877 and was an immigrant from Cornwall working as a miner in Saint Paul.  In 1904, while hospitalized for diphtheria, Williams befriended local teenager John Keller, who was recovering from the same disease. Over the next two years they lived together in Saint Paul and took two trips to the city of Winnipeg, Canada.  Keller's father did not approve of the relationship and told his son that he was no longer permitted to travel with Williams and Keller returned to his parents' home in Saint Paul.

During 1905, Williams sent Keller a number of letters expressing love for him and requesting that Keller join him in Winnipeg.  The letters contained threats if Keller did not comply, Williams wrote:

"I want you to believe that I love you now as much as I ever did, it won't be long before we will be together."
"Keep your promise to me this time, old boy, as it is your last chance. You understand what I mean and should have sense enough to keep your promise."
These letters, at the insistence of Mr and Mrs Keller, were unanswered. Williams returned to Saint Paul in April 1905 and in a fit of rage, shot Keller and Keller's mother in their home. Keller was killed instantly when he was shot in the back of the head whilst he was in bed, his mother died from a gunshot wound a week later. Keller's father was not at home at the time of the shooting.

Trial
Williams was arrested and tried for premeditated murder, though he pleaded not guilty by reason of "emotional insanity."  A police officer testified at court that Williams came to the station on the night of the murder, saying that he had shot someone, giving the address as "1 Reid Court".  The testimony of a doctor, who looked at Williams, was that "he did not know why he shot Johnny Keller, only that he wanted the boy to come with him."  When Williams took the stand, he told the court he didn't sleep for three nights prior to the murder and had been drinking heavily on the day of the shooting.

His defense was rejected and on 19 May 1905, he was convicted of murder.  Ramsey County Attorney, Thomas Kane, excluded the jurors because of their opinion against the death penalty and Williams was sentenced to death by hanging.  On 8 December 1905, the Minnesota Supreme Court affirmed his conviction and sentence although one judge dissented in the judgement, arguing that Williams's crime bore signs of a crime of passion and might have not been premeditated.

Execution
On 13 February 1906, Williams was executed in the basement of the Ramsey County Jail in Saint Paul. There were 32 witnesses present during the execution, including Daily News reporter Joseph Hennessey, who entered the jail with the crowd, despite the fact that reporters were forbidden to attend.  Before execution, Williams spoke from the gallows and insisted his innocence:

"Gentlemen, you are witnessing an illegal hanging, I am accused of killing Johnny Keller.  He was the best friend I ever had and I hope I meet him in the other world.  I never had improper relations with him.  I am resigned to my fate.  Goodbye."

Botched execution 
The rope used to hang Williams proved to be too long as its length had been miscalculated by Sheriff Miesen. As a result, Williams hit the floor after dropping through the trap door of the gallows.  Three of Miesen's deputies had to hold Williams's body up by the rope for over 14 minutes, until he died of strangulation, Williams's attorney, James Cormican, stated that execution was "a disgrace to civilisation."

Williams's botched execution was used by advocates in Minnesota to argue that capital punishment should be abolished in the state. Minnesota abolished capital punishment in 1911 and it has never been reinstated, making William Williams the last person executed by the state.

See also
 List of most recent executions by jurisdiction

References

Bibliography
John D. Bessler (2003). Legacy of Violence: Lynch Mobs and Executions in Minnesota (St. Paul: University of Minnesota Press) 
"Botched hanging led state to halt executions", Star Tribune, 2008-02-12
D. J. Tice (2001). "The Last Hangings: The Gottschalk and Williams Murder Cases, 1905", Minnesota's Twentieth Century: Stories of Extraordinary Everyday People (St. Paul: University of Minnesota Press) 
Walter N. Trenerry (1962). Murder in Minnesota: A Collection of True Cases (St. Paul: Minnesota Historical Society Press)

External links
John Bessler, "The Botched Hanging of William Williams", secretsofthecity.com, accessed 2009-02-03
Execution of William Williams in MNopedia, the Minnesota Encyclopedia

1870s births
1906 deaths
1905 murders in the United States
20th-century executions by Minnesota
20th-century executions of American people
British people executed abroad
Executed Cornish people
Deaths by strangulation in the United States
British emigrants to the United States
English people convicted of murder
English LGBT people
People convicted of murder by Minnesota
People executed by Minnesota by hanging
People executed for murder
People from Saint Paul, Minnesota
People from St Ives, Cornwall
American people of Cornish descent